The men's 100 metres event at the 1982 Commonwealth Games was held on 3 and 4 October at the QE II Stadium in Brisbane, Australia.

Medalists

Results

Heats
Qualification: First 6 in each heat (Q) and the next 6 fastest (q) qualify for the quarterfinals.

Wind:Heat 1: +1.9 m/s, Heat 2: -1.3 m/s, Heat 3: -1.6 m/s, Heat 4: 0.0 m/s, Heat 5: 0.0 m/s

Quarterfinals
Qualification: First 4 in each heat (Q) and the next 2 fastest (q) qualify for the semifinals.

Wind:Heat 1: +2.6 m/s, Heat 2: 0.0 m/s, Heat 3: +3.5 m/s, Heat 4: +2.6 m/s

Semifinals
Qualification: First 4 in each semifinal (Q) and the next 1 fastest (q) qualify for the final.

Wind:Heat 1: +0.9 m/s, Heat 2: +1.9 m/s

Final
Wind: +5.9 m/s

References

Heats & Quarterfinals results (The Sydney Morning Herald)
Quarterfinals results (The Canberra Times)
Semifinals & Final results (The Canberra Times)
Australian results 

Athletics at the 1982 Commonwealth Games
1982